James Gallagher (12 April 1920 – 11 March 1983) was an Irish Fianna Fáil politician. 

He was born in Cashel, County Sligo, on 12 April 1920, son of Matthew Gallagher, a farmer, and his wife Margaret Gallagher (née Reilly). He had 13 siblings. Gallagher was educated at Moylough national school.

A successful businessman and house builder before entering politics, Gallagher was elected to Dáil Éireann as a Fianna Fáil Teachta Dála (TD) for the Sligo–Leitrim constituency at the 1961 general election. He was re-elected at the 1965 and 1969 general elections. 

He did not contest the 1973 general election but he stood again at the 1977 general election and was again elected for Sligo–Leitrim. He did not contest the 1981 general election and retired from politics. 

His brother, Matt, was also a prominent businessman who founded the Gallagher Group.

References

1920 births
1983 deaths
Fianna Fáil TDs
Members of the 17th Dáil
Members of the 18th Dáil
Members of the 19th Dáil
Members of the 21st Dáil
Politicians from County Sligo
Irish farmers
Irish businesspeople